Eremophila attenuata, also known as Connie Sue poverty bush, is a flowering plant in the figwort family, Scrophulariaceae and is endemic to a small area in the south-east of Western Australia. It is a shrub with many branches often ending in a spine.

Description

The tube is purple and glabrous except for the inside of the tube which is densely hairy. The lower middle petal lobe covers the end of the tube. Flowering occurs in November but the fruit have not been described.

Taxonomy and naming
The species was first formally described by Robert Chinnock in 2007 with the description published in Eremophila and Allied Genera: A Monograph of the Plant Family Myoporaceae. The specific epithet (attenuata) is a Latin word meaning "narrowing" or "tapering", referring to the sepals.

Distribution and habitat
This eremophila is only known from the area where the type specimen was collected near the Connie Sue Highway near Rawlinna in the Nullarbor biogeographic region where it grows on plains, in rangelands and open depressions.

Conservation status
Eremophila attenuata is classified as "Priority One" by the Government of Western Australia Department of Biodiversity, Conservation and Attractions, meaning that it is known from only one or a few locations which are potentially at risk.

References

attenuata
Eudicots of Western Australia
Plants described in 2007
Endemic flora of Western Australia
Taxa named by Ferdinand von Mueller